Marek Żuławski (13 April 1908 – 30 March 1985) was a Polish painter, graphic artist and art historian who settled in London in 1937.

Background and career
He was born in Rome. His father was Jerzy Żuławski, a noted intellectual from a prolific extended family of artists, directors and climbers; his mother was Kazimiera Żuławska, née Hanicka. He was raised in Zakopane with his two younger brothers, Juliusz and Wawrzyniec. Later, the family moved to Toruń where he completed his secondary education.
 
Between 1926 and 1933 he studied at the Academy of Fine Arts in Warsaw under professors Felicjan Kowarski and Karol Tichy at the same time as his cousin, Jacek Żuławski. In 1935 he won a scholarship to study in Paris. In 1937 he moved permanently to London. There he frequented other Polish artists, including Feliks Topolski, Halima Nałęcz, Marian Szyszko-Bohusz and the Themersons.

Initially he was influenced by Post-Impressionism. After the war he honed his own style, tending towards a simpler form and a more muted palette. His subjects included still life and figurative art such as Chrystus z Belsen 1947, Tancerz 1957, Kain i Abel 1967, Żona Lota 1975 and Akt stojący II 1979, a work on paper. Apart from easel work, he completed several murals as in Our Lady's church in St John's Wood in London, illustrations and graphic art. He created posters (Gordon Bennet, 1935), still lifes and landscape paintings. Żuławski exhibited on numerous occasions at the London Group.

Written work 
He also wrote art criticism and essays, notably, Od Hogartha do Bacona (1973), ("From Hogarth to Bacon"), and Romantyzm, klasycyzm i z powrotem (1976) ("Romanticism, classicism and back again"). He produced a number of talks about art for the BBC Polish Section. He wrote a two-part autobiography, Studium do autoportretu (1980), which was republished in a second edition by the publishing house Oficyna Wydawnicza Kucharski in Poland.

Personal life
In 1938 he married Eugenia (Imogena) Różańska (1906–1982), but the marriage was short-lived.
His second wife, Halina Korn (1902–1978), was also a writer and painter. In 1980 Żuławski married Maria Lewandowska. Their son, Adam, was born in January 1983.

In March 1985 Żuławski died in London.
His archives are in the Archiwum Emigracji University of Torun Library, and a collection of his art – drawings, graphic art and paintings – is in the Torun University Museum.

Notable artworks
 Gordon Bennet, 1935
 Quarry Worker, 1949
 Chrystus wśród ubogich, 1953
 Ludzie nad morzem, 1957
 Tancerz, 1957
 Zielony akt na pomarańczowym i czarnym tle, 1958
 Ecce homo II, 1958
 Ecce homo IV, 1961
 Trzy przedmioty na czerwonym tle, 1963/1968
 Kain i Abel, 1967
 Sen o lataniu, 1968
 Martwy człowiek, 1969
 The Team, 1971
 Caribbean Cruise, 1974
 Mechanical Man, 1975
 Żona Lota, 1975
 Marylka w sierpniu, 1979
 Akt stojący II, 1979 
 Standing Nude, 1980
 Ojcostwo, 1980
 Wyżyna Golan, c. 1982
 Robotnik, unknown year

Family tree

References

Bibliography

External links
 Marek Żuławski official website
 Translating Marek: English translations of excerpts from Marek Zulawski's autobiography
 Marek Żuławski official website - University Museum in Torun, Poland
 Gallery 
 Marek Żuławski on Culture.pl

1908 births
1985 deaths
20th-century Polish painters
20th-century Polish male artists
Polish graphic designers
Polish illustrators
People from Zakopane
People from Toruń
Polish emigrants to the United Kingdom
Polish war artists
Expressionist painters
Burials at Kensal Green Cemetery
Artists from Warsaw
Artists from London
British war artists
World War II artists
Academy of Fine Arts in Warsaw alumni
Polish essayists
Polish male writers
Male essayists
20th-century essayists
Polish male painters